Achladokampos is a village and a former community in Argolis, Peloponnese, Greece. Since the 2011 local government reform it is part of the municipality Argos-Mykines, of which it is a municipal unit. The municipal unit has an area of 105.883 km2. Population 497 (2011). It is located on a mountainside approximately midway between Argos and Tripoli (~30 km from each) at an elevation of approximately 450 meters.

A significant number of emigrants from Achladokampos have settled in the United States since the early 20th century and have formed the Brotherhood of Achladokambiton as a means of keeping in touch.

References

External links

Populated places in Argolis